Rybaki may refer to the following places:
Rybaki, Gmina Dobrzyniewo Duże in Podlaskie Voivodeship (north-east Poland)
Rybaki, Gmina Michałowo in Podlaskie Voivodeship (north-east Poland)
Rybaki, Hajnówka County in Podlaskie Voivodeship (north-east Poland)
Rybaki, Łomża County in Podlaskie Voivodeship (north-east Poland)
Rybaki, Mońki County in Podlaskie Voivodeship (north-east Poland)
Rybaki, Łódź Voivodeship (central Poland)
Rybaki, Opole Lubelskie County in Lublin Voivodeship (east Poland)
Rybaki, Ryki County in Lublin Voivodeship (east Poland)
Rybaki, Masovian Voivodeship (east-central Poland)
Rybaki, Lubusz Voivodeship (west Poland)
Rybaki, Kartuzy County in Pomeranian Voivodeship (north Poland)
Rybaki, Tczew County in Pomeranian Voivodeship (north Poland)
Rybaki, Elbląg County in Warmian-Masurian Voivodeship (north Poland)
Rybaki, Olsztyn County in Warmian-Masurian Voivodeship (north Poland)
Rybaki, Ostróda County in Warmian-Masurian Voivodeship (north Poland)
Rybaki, West Pomeranian Voivodeship (north-west Poland)
 Polish name for Primorsk, Kaliningrad Oblast